Michael Theodore Malinin (born October 10, 1967) is an American musician known for his work as drummer of the Goo Goo Dolls. He has been drumming for Tanya Tucker since 2016.

Family

Michael Malinin was born in Washington, D.C., one of the four children of Dorothy ( Rearick) and Dr. Theodore Malinin ( Fedor Malinin), a surgeon. His father was born in Krasnodar, Russia, and emigrated to the United States in 1949. His mother is from Illinois, of German and English descent.

Michael Malinin is married to Krista Galante; the couple has two children.

Career
Malinin began playing drums in middle school and later studied music at the University of North Texas. While there, Malinin played in the band Caulk, and recorded their first EP with them before leaving the band. Afterwards, Malinin moved to Los Angeles to pursue music full-time. From December 1994 until December 27, 2013, Malinin played drums for the Goo Goo Dolls.

Since 2016, Malinin has served as music director and drummer for Tanya Tucker.

References

1967 births
Living people
Alternative rock drummers
American alternative rock musicians
American rock drummers
Goo Goo Dolls members
Musicians from Washington, D.C.
Musicians from Miami
20th-century American drummers
American male drummers